Do Travel Writers Go to Hell? is a memoir and gonzo travelogue written by Thomas Kohnstamm and published by Three Rivers Press.

The book was met with a global media coverage prior to its release and positive reviews when it hit the shelves in April 2008.

A book review in The New York Times calls "this rollicking exposé of the travel book industry...the most depraved travel book of the year".  The book was also criticised by Robert Hauptman who said that the author "did many distasteful things", described one incident related in the text as "nauseating" and considered his attitude to be cynical. There was some controversy when the book was released.

References 

2008 non-fiction books
Travel autobiographies
American travel books
American autobiographies
American memoirs
Three Rivers Press books